Guido is a surname. Notable people with the surname include:

 Alejandro Guido (born 1994), American soccer player
 Beatriz Guido (1924–1988), Argentine novelist and screenwriter
 Guilherme Guido (born 1987), Brazilian swimmer
 José María Guido (1910–1975), interim President of Argentina from 1962 to 1963
 Luigi Guido (born 1968), Italian judoka
 Marcello Guido (born 1953), Italian architect
Margaret Guido (1912–1994), British archaeologist, prehistorian, and finds specialist
 Tomás Guido (1788–1866), general in the Argentine War of Independence, diplomat and politician

Italian-language surnames